The Trade and Industry Bureau is a former policy bureau of the Hong Kong Government, responsible for promoting Hong Kong's access to the world market, helping Hong Kong manufacturers remain competitive in international markets, enhancing the protection of intellectual property rights, and promoting Hong Kong customers' interests. It was headed by Secretary for Trade and Industry.

Established as the Trade and Industry Branch in 1982 from the then  (Chinese: 經濟科), along with the defederalisation of the Trade, Industry and Customs Department, it was renamed a bureau on 1 July 1997 upon the transfer of sovereignty of Hong Kong, and lasted until July 1, 2000, when it was renamed and reorganised as the Commerce and Industry Bureau to reflect its expanded responsibilities in Hong Kong's industry and commerce. It was further renamed the Commerce, Industry and Technology Bureau in 2002.

See also
 Government Secretariat (Hong Kong)

References

Hong Kong government departments and agencies